Luz Donoso Puelma (born 1921 in Santiago, Chile, died January 18, 2008), also known as Luz Donoso, was a Chilean graphic artist, muralist, political activist, and teacher. Beginning in the mid 1960s, Donoso was one of the most prominent participants in the muralist movement that supported Salvador Allende’s presidential campaign. In the first months of the dictatorship she was dismissed from her teaching position at the University of Chile, like many of her colleagues, and shortly after co-founded an artist run work space and forum, Taller de Artes Visuales (TAV).

Selected exhibitions

 1976 – Instituto Chileno Frances, Santiago  
 1977 – Cuatro Grabadores Chilenos, Galleria Cromo, Santiago
1978 – Participated in the collective Exposition  "Recreando a Goya" at the Goethe institute, Santiago Chile.
1983 – Chilenas en Berlin, Berlin
 1987 – Mujer, Arte y Perferia, floating Curatorial Gallery, Women in Focus, Vancouver
 2011 - Una Accion hecha por otro es una obra de la Luz Donoso, Centro de Arte Contemporaneo de Las Condes, Santiago
2012 – Her work was featured in a Collective exposition organized by The Red Conceptualismos de Sur "Perder la forma humana. Una imagen sismica de los anos ochenta en America Latina" at the Museo Nacional Centro de Arte Reina Sofía in Madrid.
2015 – Her work was featured in a collective exposition "Ausencia encarnada, Efimeralidad y collectividad en el art chileno en los anos setenta" curated by Liz Munsell at the Museo de la Solidaridad Salvador Allende, Santiago, Chile.
2016 – Her work was featured in a collective exposition "Poner el cuerpo. Llamamientos de arte y politica en los anos ochenta en America Latina" curated by Javier Manzi y Paulina Varas at the Museo de la Solidaridad Salvador Allende, Santiago, Chile. 
2017 – Radical Women: Latin American Art, 1960–1985

References

External links 
 IMAGEN DE LA (DES) APARICIÓN, CIRCULACIÓN Y COLECTIVIDAD EN LA OBRA DE LUZ DONOSO Y HERNÁN PARADA 
 Conversación en torno al libro “Luz Donoso. El arte y la acción en el presente” at the Museum of Memory and Human Rights 
 "Mujeres que se visualizan" :(En)gendering archives and regimes of media and visuality in post-1968
 Archivo de archivos: la memoria de Luz Donoso at El Desconcierto 
Hammer Museum "Radical Women"
" Ausencia encarnada. Efimeralidad y Colectividad en el arte chileno en los anos setenta" Museo de la Solidaridad (in Spanish)

1921 births
2008 deaths
20th-century Chilean women artists
Artists from Santiago
University of Chile alumni
Academic staff of the University of Chile